Santo Independent School District is a public school district based in the community of Santo, Texas (USA).

Located in Palo Pinto County, the district extends into small portions of Parker and Erath counties.

Santo ISD has two campuses - Santo High (Grades 6–12) and Santo Elementary (Grades PK-5).

In 2009, the school district was rated "recognized" by the Texas Education Agency.

References

External links
Santo ISD

School districts in Palo Pinto County, Texas
School districts in Erath County, Texas
School districts in Parker County, Texas